Kuwait SC enter the season as defending champions.

This season there will be three relegated teams with Al Tadhamon for the return of Kuwaiti Division One tournament with Burgan SC.

Teams

 Al Arabi
 Al Fahaheel
 Al Jahra
 Al Kuwait
 Al Nasar
 Al Qadsia
 Al Sahel
 Al Sulaibikhat
 Al Salmiyah
 Al Shabab
 Al Tadhamon*
 Yarmouk
 Kazma
 Khaitan

(*) bankruptcy, did not compete.

Source:

Personnel and kits

Standings

Awards
Top Goal Scorer(Golden Boot): Firas Al-Khatib (23)
Top Kuwaiti Goal Scorer: Bader Al-Mutawa (19)
Most Assists: Ahmad Al-Dhefiri (12)
Best Goalkeeper(Golden Glove): Khaled Al-Rashidi

See also
2015-16 in Kuwaiti football

References

External links
Kuwait League Fixtures and Results at FIFA
Kuwaiti Premier League (Arabic)
xscores.com Kuwait Premier League
goalzz.com - Kuwaiti League
RSSSF.com - Kuwait - List of Champions

Kuwait Premier League seasons
Premier League
Kuwaiti Premier League